H. G. Burleigh House is a historic home located at Ticonderoga in Essex County, New York.  The home was originally owned by U.S. Congressman Henry G. Burleigh, and was built in 1894 and enlarged in 1905.  It is a -story, irregularly massed stone and concrete veneer Queen Anne–style building with Colonial Revival features.  It is a -story, rectangular, gable-roofed structure built of brick. It features a central Palladian window at the second level.  It features complex massing, molded chimneys, multiple roofs, corner towers, as well as classical columned and shingle-sheathed porches.

It was listed on the National Register of Historic Places in 1988.

References

	

Houses on the National Register of Historic Places in New York (state)
Queen Anne architecture in New York (state)
Houses completed in 1894
Houses in Essex County, New York
National Register of Historic Places in Essex County, New York